San Roberto is a comune (municipality) in the Province of Reggio Calabria in the Italian region Calabria, located about  southwest of Catanzaro and about  northeast of Reggio Calabria.

San Roberto borders the following municipalities: Calanna, Fiumara, Laganadi, Santo Stefano in Aspromonte, Scilla.

Demographic evolution

References

Cities and towns in Calabria